Laurent Quellet (born 26 February 1952) is a Swiss sailor. He competed in the 470 event at the 1976 Summer Olympics.

References

External links
 

1952 births
Living people
Swiss male sailors (sport)
Olympic sailors of Switzerland
Sailors at the 1976 Summer Olympics – 470
Place of birth missing (living people)
20th-century Swiss people